An involucrum (plural involucra) is a layer of new bone growth outside existing bone.

There are two main contexts:
 In pyogenic osteomyelitis where it is a layer of living bone that has formed about dead bone.   It can be identified by radiographically (i.e., with x-rays).
 In cetaceans such as whales, it is a thick covering of bone over the middle-ear space.

See also
Sequestrum

References

Skeletal system